Miss Universe Malaysia 2015, the 49th edition of the Miss Universe Malaysia, was held on 17 April 2015 at Shangri-La Hotel, Kuala Lumpur. Vanessa Tevi Kumares of Negeri Sembilan was crowned by the outgoing titleholder, Sabrina Beneetof Perak at the end of the event. She then represented Malaysia at the Miss Universe 2014 pageant in Las Vegas, United States.

Results

Special awards

Contestants

Crossovers 

Miss Cosmopolitan World
 2015 - Kohinoor Kaur Kaittiani (2nd Runner-up)

Miss Cosmopolitan Malaysia
 2015 - Kohinoor Kaur Kaittiani (Winner)

Miss India Worldwide 
 2013 - Jasveer Sandhu  (1st Runner-up)

Miss India Malaysia
 2013 - Jasveer Sandhu  (Winner)

Asia Model Festival Awards 
 2011 - Kelly Jagan (Star Model Awards)

Miss World Malaysia
 2011 - Kohinoor Kaur Kaittiani (Finalists Top 25)

Miss Earth Sabah
 2011 - Kohinoor Kaur Kaittiani (Withdrew)

Miss Universe Malaysia
 2012 - Sugeeta Chandran (Finalists Top 19)
 2011 - Kelly Jagan (Finalists Top 10)

Ford Models Supermodel of the World Malaysia  
 2009 - Kelly Jagan (Winner)

References

External links

Universe Malaysia
2015 in Malaysia
2015
Women in Kuala Lumpur
April 2015 events in Malaysia